The United States Air Force's 7th Air Support Operations Squadron is a combat support unit located at Fort Bliss, Texas.

Mission
The squadron provides tactical command and control of air power assets to the Joint Forces Air Component Commander and Joint Forces Land Component Commander for combat operations. The desert terrain of Fort Bliss offers a perfect training ground for Joint Terminal Attack Controllers to continue their training. The support the 7th offers the Army is deploying with its divisions, for example, the 1AD (1st Armored Division), and acting as the gateway to the Air Force's attack aircraft to neutralize any hostile threats that the Army division themselves cannot face.

Lineage
 Constituted as the 7th Air Base Communications Detachment (Special) on 27 January 1944
 Activated on 17 February 1944
 Inactivated on 7 December 1945
 Disbanded on 8 October 1948
 Reconstituted and redesignated 7th Air Support Operations Squadron on 12 August 2008
 Activated on 15 August 2008

Assignments
 Western Signal Aviation Unit Training Center, 17 February 1944
 Unknown, 19 April-10 July 1944
 Tenth Air Force, 11 July 1944
 Fourteenth Air Force, 30 September 1944
 312th Fighter Wing, 13 March–7 December 1945
 3d Air Support Operations Group, 15 August 2008 – present

Stations
 Camp Pinedale, California, 17 February 1944
 Camp Patrick Henry, Virginia, 19 April–3 May 1944
 Oran, Algeria, 21–28 May 1944
 New Delhi, India, 11 July 1944
 Kanchrapara, India, 15 August 1944
 Shuangliu, China, 25 November 1944
 India, unknown – 8 November 1945
 Camp Kilmer, New Jersey, 6–7 December 1945
 Fort Bliss, Texas, 15 August 2008 – present

References

Notes

Bibliography

Military units and formations in Texas
Air Support Operations 0007